Aung Khin was mayor of Yangon from 1986 to 1988.

References

Mayors of Yangon
Living people
Year of birth missing (living people)